Spain has a total of 92 prisons, also called penitentiary centers or penitentiary establishments. They report to the General Secretariat for Penitentiary Institutions, a department of the Ministry of the Interior, with the exception of those located in the regions of Catalonia and the Basque Country, due to the delegation of powers from the Spanish government in 1984 and 2021, respectively. Social insertion centers are not included. There are only two penitentiary psychiatric hospitals in Spain, one in Seville and the other in Foncalent (Alicante).

Prisons in Spain by autonomous community (includes autonomous cities)

Notes

References 

Lists of buildings and structures in Spain